St Oswald's Church, East Stoke is a Grade II* listed Church of England parish in the Diocese of Southwell and Nottingham in East Stoke, Nottinghamshire. Originally built in the 13th or 14th century, it was largely rebuilt in 1738 and most of the furniture is from the 19th century.

It is adjacent to Stoke Hall.

History

The church dates from the 13th or 14th century, and was largely rebuilt in 1738. A further restoration on the chancel took place in 1873. Most of the furniture is from the 19th century.

References

Grade II* listed churches in Nottinghamshire
Church of England church buildings in Nottinghamshire